IDQ may refer to:

 International Dairy Queen, a chain of soft serve and fast food restaurants; subsidiary of Berkshire Hathaway
 IDQ (TV station), in Australia
 ID Quantique, a Geneva, Switzerland  company which provides quantum key distribution (QKD) systems, single photon counters, and hardware random number generators